The Eternal Curse is a 1921 German silent drama film directed by Fritz Wendhausen and starring Charlotte Schultz, Rudolf Forster, and Karl Etlinger.

The film's sets were designed by the art director Walter Reimann and Hermann Warm. It was shot at the Babelsberg Studios in Berlin and on location in Hamburg.

Cast

References

Bibliography

External links

1921 films
Films of the Weimar Republic
Films directed by Fritz Wendhausen
German silent feature films
1921 drama films
German drama films
UFA GmbH films
German black-and-white films
Films shot at Babelsberg Studios
Silent drama films
1920s German films